The 2017–18 Arkansas State Red Wolves women's basketball team represents Arkansas State University during the 2017–18 NCAA Division I women's basketball season. The Red Wolves, led by eighteenth year head coach Brian Boyer, play their home games at First National Bank Arena in Jonesboro, Arkansas as members of the Sun Belt Conference. They finished the season 15–15, 10–8 in Sun Belt play to finish in a 3 way tie for sixth place. They lost in the first round of the Sun Belt women's tournament to Appalachian State.

Previous season
They finished the season 7–25, 4–14 in Sun Belt play to finish in eleventh place. They advanced to the quarterfinals of the Sun Belt women's tournament where they lost to Troy.

Roster

Schedule

|-
!colspan=9 style=| Exhibition

|-
!colspan=9 style=| Non-conference regular season

|-
!colspan=9 style=| Sun Belt regular season

|-
!colspan=9 style=| Sun Belt Women's Tournament

See also
2017–18 Arkansas State Red Wolves men's basketball team

References

External links

Arkansas State Red Wolves women's basketball seasons
Arkansas State